Dimitris Theofanis (born 31 May 1933), nicknamed Loris, is a Greek retired football striker and later manager.

References

External links

1933 births
Living people
Sportspeople from Nafpaktos
Greek footballers
Super League Greece players
Athinaikos F.C. players
Panathinaikos F.C. players
Greece international footballers
Greek football managers
Panegialios F.C. managers
Ethnikos Piraeus F.C. managers
Association football forwards
Doxa Vyronas F.C. managers